Signal Knob may refer to:

 Signal Knob (Kentucky)
 Signal Knob (New Mexico)
 Signal Knob (South Dakota)
 Signal Knob (Tennessee)
 Signal Knob (Virginia)
 Signal Knob (West Virginia)